Creighton is an unincorporated community in Pennington County, in the U.S. state of South Dakota.

History
Creighton was laid out in 1909, and named after Creighton, Nebraska, the native home of the first settlers. A post office called Creighton was established in 1908, and remained in operation until 1984.

References

Unincorporated communities in Pennington County, South Dakota
Unincorporated communities in South Dakota